Ted Jones may refer to:

Edward D. "Ted" Jones (1925–1990), son of the founder of Edward Jones Investments
Ted Jones (neuroscientist) (1939–2011), neuroscientist and neuroanatomist
Ted Jones (hydroplanes) (died 2000), hydroplane designer and driver
Ted Jones (trade unionist) (1896-1978), Welsh trade union leader
Teddy Jones (1910–1989), Australian rules footballer
 Ted Jones (Pineapple Express), fictional drug lord and the primary antagonist of Pineapple Express

See also
Edward Jones (disambiguation)
Theodore Jones (disambiguation)